Arpad or Árpád is a Hungarian masculine given name. Notable people with the name include:

 Árpád Ambrusz (born 1980), Hungarian football player
 Árpád Balázs (born 1937), Hungarian classical music composer
 Árpád Bárány (born 1931), Hungarian Olympic fencer
 Árpád Basch (1873–1944), Hungarian painter and graphic artist
 Arpad Busson (born 1963), French financier and London-based socialite
 Árpád Bogsch (1919–2004), Hungarian turned American international civil servant
 Árpád Csonka (born 1991), Slovak football player
 Arpad Darazs (1922–1986), Hungarian-American music educator
 Árpád Doppler (1857–1927), Hungarian-German composer
 Árpád Duka-Zólyomi (born 1941), Slovak politician and Member of the European Parliament
 Arpad Elo (1903–1992), the creator of the Elo rating system for two-player games such as chess
 Árpád Feszty (1856–1914), Hungarian painter
 Árpád Göncz (born 1922), Hungarian liberal politician and former President of Hungary
 Arpád Györi (born 1970), Czech ice hockey player and coach
 Árpád Házi (1908–1970), Hungarian communist politician
 Árpád Henney (1895–1980), Hungarian politician and military officer who served as Minister without portfolio between 1944 and 1945 in the Nazi-dominated Ferenc Szálasi cabinet
 Arpad Joó (born 1948), Hungarian conductor and concert pianist
 Árpád Lengyel (1915–1993), Hungarian swimmer
 Árpád Majoros (born 1983), Hungarian football player 
 Árpád Milinte (born 1976), Hungarian football player
 Árpád von Nahodyl (born 1958), German writer, neopagan activist and politician
 Árpád Orbán (1938–2008), Hungarian football player
 Árpád Pál (born 1955), Hungarian former handball player 
 Árpád Pédery (1891–1914), Hungarian gymnast
 Árpád Prandler (born 1930), Hungarian judge of the International Criminal Tribunal
 Árpád Pusztai (born 1930), Hungarian-born biochemist and nutritionist
 Arpád Račko (born 1930), Slovak sculptor
 Arpad Simonyik (born 1940), Canadian sprint canoer
 Árpád Soltész (born 1944), Hungarian sprint canoer
 Árpád Soós (zoologist) (1912–1991), Hungarian zoologist, entomologist and museologist
 Árpád Sterbik (born 1979), Serbian-born Spanish handball player
 Árpád Szabó (1878–1948), Hungarian politician
 Árpád Szakasits (1888–1965), Hungarian Social Democrat, then Communist political figure
 Árpád Székely (living), Hungarian ambassador to the Russian Federation
 Árpád Szenes (1897–1985), Hungarian-Jewish abstract painter who worked in France
 Árpád Tóth (1886–1928), Hungarian poet and translator
 Árpád Vajda (1896–1967), Hungarian chess master
 Arpad Vass (born 1959), research scientist and forensic anthropologist
 Arpad Vass (footballer) (born 1989), Slovenian football player
 Árpád von Degen (1866–1934), Hungarian biologist and botanist
 Árpád Weisz (1896–1944), Hungarian Olympic football player and manager
 Arpad Wigand (1906–1983), SS-Oberführer who served as the SS and Police Leader in Warsaw

Hungarian masculine given names